"Hello Heartbreak" is a song recorded by American singer-songwriter Michelle Williams. It was co-written by Jim Jonsin and Rico Love, and produced by Jonsin for Williams' third studio album Unexpected (2008).

Critical reception
"Hello Heartbreak" received universally positive reception from critics. Mikael Wood of the Billboard described the song as a "shiny electro-R&B gem", while Josette Compton of Entertainment Weekly noted the "technodriven" track is "reminiscent of Kylie Minogue". Pete Lewis of Blues & Soul also compared the song to other works, commenting that the "synth-heavy uptempo cut" "heavily" relies "on the kind of Euro-dance-inspired electronica utilised recently by fellow US urbanites like Timbaland and Justin Timberlake".

Release
Single was released in United States on December 2, 2008, for digital download and airplay through Columbia and Music World. In June 2009, Michelle confirmed via Twitter that her album Unexpected would receive a full UK re-release and that "Hello Heartbreak" would be the first single set for release in July 2009. In August 2009, Music Week reported "Hello Heartbreak" was due for a UK release on August 31, as a single and as Williams' fourth studio album.

Track listings

Notes
  signifies additional producer

Credits and personnel 
Credits adapted from the liner notes of Unexpected.

 Fritz – mixing engineer
 Joe Gonzales – engineer
 Jim Jonsin – producer, writer
 Rico Love – vocal producer, writer
 Dan Nain – recording engineer
 Michelle Williams – vocals

Charts

Release history

References

2008 singles
Columbia Records singles
Michelle Williams (singer) songs
Song recordings produced by Alex da Kid
Songs written by Jim Jonsin
Songs written by Rico Love